This is a list of cities in Portugal. In Portugal, a city is an honorific term given to locations that meet several criteria, such as having a minimum number of inhabitants, good infrastructure (schools, medical care, cultural and sports facilities), or have a major historical importance. The country's demographic expansion of the 1980s prompted the elevation of several towns to city status and, as of 2018, 159 locations in Portugal are considered a city.

Overview
In Portugal, the city is not an administrative division, therefore a city generally does not necessarily correspond to a municipality, with the exception of the entirely urban municipalities, such as Lisbon, Porto, Funchal, Amadora, Entroncamento, and São João da Madeira.

The municipality with the most cities is Paredes Municipality, which contains four cities.

Until 1910, a location was proclaimed city by royal charter (carta régia), which happened 25 times to current Portuguese cities (royal charters were also granted to cities of the Portuguese Empire; for example, São Paulo in 1711). During the Portuguese First Republic, the process was transferred to the parliament, which elevated three towns to the category of city. The dictatorial Estado Novo regime proclaimed seven cities on the Portuguese mainland (as well as some more in the colonies), this time by government decree. After the 1974 Carnation Revolution, proclamation of cities returned to parliament and now, Portugal has 156 cities, one of the consequences being that the title no longer holds the prestige it once had.

Eight locations have been always considered cities since Portugal became an independent kingdom (de facto 1128): Braga, Coimbra, Lamego, Porto and Viseu, as well as Évora, Lisbon and Silves, which were annexed at a later date.
Guarda was the first city proclaimed as part of the independent kingdom, in 1199.

City designation 
In Portugal, a locality can only be called a city if more than 8,000 inhabitants live in the city's urban area. In addition, at least half of the following infrastructure must be present:

 Hospital
 Pharmacy
 Fire department
 Event center and cultural center
 Museum and library
 Hotel
 Primary and secondary school
 Pre-school and kindergarten
 Public transportation
 Garden or public park

Cities being towns 
In Portugal there are localities with more than 8,000 inhabitants and with the required infrastructure installed, but not having the designation of "city", but rather as "town", for example:

 Algueirão-Mem Martins
 Corroios
 Rio de Mouro
 Cascais
 Sintra

Towns being cities 
Just as there are "cities" being "towns", there are also "towns" being "cities", because they have the required infrastructure in place, but have no more than 8,000 inhabitants or because since the locality received the designation "city" it has lost over the years the 8,000 inhabitants, for example:

 Miranda do Douro
 Santana
 Sabugal
 Peso da Régua
 Reguengos de Monsaraz

Metropolitan Areas 
Portugal's two metropolitan areas, Lisbon with over 2.8 million inhabitants and Porto with over 1.7 million inhabitants, are the largest agglomerations in the country. In the two metropolitan areas, in addition to the large cities of Lisbon and Porto, there are other cities that together form the metropolitan area.

The Lisbon Metropolitan Area consists of the large city of Lisbon, but also the cities of Amadora, Queluz, Setúbal, Almada, Agualva-Cacém, etc.

The Porto Metropolitan Area is made up of the large city of Porto, but also the cities of Vila Nova de Gaia, Gondomar, Rio Tinto, Póvoa de Varzim, Matosinhos, etc.

Large cities outside metropolitan areas 
There are also large cities in Portugal that do not belong to any metropolitan area. These cities are mostly capitals of sub-regions that are not considered metropolitan areas because the population is mainly located in the capital of the sub-region.

The city of Braga is the capital of the sub-region of Cávado.

The city of Funchal is the capital of the autonomous region of Madeira.

The city of Coimbra is the capital of the sub-region Região de Coimbra.

Urban Areas 
The following list shows the number of inhabitants and the population density of each respective city. Only the inhabitants living in the urban area are counted, not the inhabitants living in the entire municipality.

In the case of large cities like Vila Nova de Gaia, Braga, Coimbra and Setubal, the inhabitants of the entire municipality are not listed, because the municipality does not only include the city, but also other towns and villages around the city, which nevertheless belong to the municipality, but form a separate parish and therefore do not belong to the respective city.

In the case of large cities like Lisbon, Porto, Amadora and Funchal, the inhabitants of the entire municipality are listed because the city spreads over the entire municipality and the respective parishes within the municipality are seen as "neighborhoods".

Cities with an italic font are capitals of subregions, cities with a bold font are capitals of regions.

See also
 List of Portuguese cities by population
 Subdivisions of Portugal
 List of towns in Portugal
 List of municipalities of Portugal
 List of parishes of Portugal
 List of cities in Europe

References

External links
 National Association of Portuguese Municipalities

Portugal geography-related lists
Portugal, List of Cities in
 
05